Seven Years in Tibet is a 1956 British documentary film directed by Hans Nieter. It is based on the book of the same name. It was entered into the 1956 Cannes Film Festival.

References

External links

1956 films
1956 documentary films
British documentary films
1950s English-language films
1950s British films